José Basco y Vargas, 1st Count of the Conquest of Batanes Islands ( (1733–1805) was a naval officer of the Spanish Navy who served as the 53rd governor of the Spanish Philippines under the Spanish Empire, from 1778 to 1787. An "economic minded" governor-general in Spanish-ruled Philippines, his rule tried to subjugate the Ivatan natives of Batanes, which led to the murder of Ivatan indigenous hero Aman Dangat.

Governor General of the Philippines
He established the Sociedad Económica de los Amigos del País, or the Economic Society of Friends of the Country, which revived the tobacco industry in the Spanish Philippines. He established the basis for the massive growth  of Philippine agricultural export, with a policy of tolerance toward (theoretically) illegal activity of foreign retailers, mainly the English and North Americans, who went to Manila to complete their product shipments. He also made the colony independent by freeing it from the control of New Spain and other Pacific Islands including the Philippines. Hoping to free the Philippines from Mexican and Chinese trade, Basco established reforms including incentivizing the production of cotton, spices, sugarcane, and mining, as well as rewarding scientific reforms.

In 1782, Basco sent an expedition to conduct the formalities of acquiring the Ivatans' consent to become subjects of the king of Spain. The Ivatans, with their elders and leaders such as the heroic Aman Dangat, revolted against Spanish rule. Regardless, on June 26, 1783, Joseph Huelva y Melgarjo was declared by the Spanish government as first governor of Batanes. The new province was named Provincia de la Concepcion and Governor General Basco was named “Conde de la Conquista de Batanes” and the capital town, Basco, was named after him. By January 21, 1789, King Carlos III granted in prize to his numerous services the title of Count of Conquista of the Batanes Islands; grace to which he added to the appointments of Squad leader and Governor of Cartagena. Basco was replaced by Pedro de Sarrio on November 22, 1787.

References

Basco, Josebascoy
Counts of Spain
People from Málaga
1733 births
1805 deaths

Spanish nobility